Piscataquis County is a county located in the U.S. state of Maine. As of the 2020 census, its population was 16,800, making it Maine's least-populous county. Its county seat is Dover-Foxcroft. The county was incorporated on March 23, 1838, taken from the western part of Penobscot County and the eastern part of Somerset County. It is named for an Abenaki word meaning "branch of the river" or "at the river branch."

It is located at the geographic center of Maine. Originally it extended north to the Canada–US border, but in 1844 its northern portion was annexed by Aroostook County. In land area, Piscataquis is one of the largest U.S. counties east of the Mississippi River. It is also one of two counties in the Northeast (and seven counties east of the Mississippi River) that meet Frederick Jackson Turner's requirements for "frontier" country – that is, having fewer than six inhabitants per square mile, the other being Hamilton County, New York.

Baxter State Park, a large wilderness preserve, is located in Piscataquis County.

Geography
It is the second-largest county in Maine by area.

Adjacent counties
 Aroostook County – north
 Penobscot County – southeast
 Somerset County – west

Demographics

2000 census
As of the 2000 census, there were 17,235 people, 7,278 households, and 4,854 families residing in the county. The population density was 4 people per square mile (2/km2). There were 13,783 housing units at an average density of 4 per square mile (1/km2). The racial makeup of the county was 97.84% White, 0.21% Black or African American, 0.52% Native American, 0.27% Asian, 0.02% Pacific Islander, 0.14% from other races, and 1.00% from two or more races. 0.52% of the population were Hispanic or Latino of any race. 23.6% were of English, 16.4% French, 15.3% United States or American and 11.5% Irish ancestry according to Census 2000. 96.9% spoke English and 2.0% French as their first language.

There were 7,278 households, out of which 28.60% had children under the age of 18 living with them, 54.10% were married couples living together, 8.40% had a female householder with no husband present, and 33.30% were non-families. 27.80% of all households were made up of individuals, and 14.00% had someone living alone who was 65 years of age or older. The average household size was 2.34 and the average family size was 2.83.

In the county, the population was spread out, with 23.40% under the age of 18, 5.70% from 18 to 24, 26.00% from 25 to 44, 27.50% from 45 to 64, and 17.40% who were 65 years of age or older. The median age was 42 years. For every 100 females there were 96.40 males. For every 100 females age 18 and over, there were 95.20 males.

The median income for a household in the county was $28,250, and the median income for a family was $34,852. Males had a median income of $28,149 versus $20,241 for females. The per capita income for the county was $14,374. About 11.20% of families and 14.80% of the population were below the poverty line, including 17.80% of those under age 18 and 13.90% of those age 65 or over.

2010 census
As of the 2010 United States census, there were 17,535 people, 7,825 households, and 4,948 families residing in the county. The racial makeup of the county was 96.9% white, 0.7% Asian, 0.5% American Indian, 0.3% black or African American, 0.3% from other races, and 1.2% from two or more races. Those of Hispanic or Latino origin made up 1.0% of the population. In terms of ancestry, 21.4% were English, 16.5% were Irish, 13.6% were American, 8.7% were German, 5.5% were Scottish, and 5.3% were French Canadian.

Of the 7,825 households, 23.6% had children under the age of 18 living with them, 50.1% were married couples living together, 8.5% had a female householder with no husband present, 36.8% were non-families, and 30.5% of all households were made up of individuals. The average household size was 2.21 and the average family size was 2.70. The median age was 48.1 years.

The median income for a household in the county was $34,016 and the median income for a family was $43,821. Males had a median income of $34,575 versus $28,014 for females. The per capita income for the county was $19,870. About 12.3% of families and 16.2% of the population were below the poverty line, including 24.9% of those under age 18 and 12.6% of those age 65 or over.

Religion
Piscataquis County has one of the lowest rates of religious adherence in the United States. The county ranks at 3,085 of 3,148 counties (lowest 2%), with 20.5% of the population regularly attending congregations or claiming religious membership.

In Maine, Piscataquis County ranks tenth of the 16 counties in percentage of religious adherents. The State of Maine has the lowest percentage of religious adherents in the United States at 27%.

Government and politics

County officials
The following individuals hold county offices:
 Interim County Manager: Tom Lizotte
 County Treasurer: Johanna Greenfield
 Mayor: Paul Paydos
 Finance Administrator: Kathy Walsh
 Sheriff: Robert Young
 EMA Director: Tom Capraro
 Probate Register: Donna Peterson
 Deeds Register: Linda Smith
 District Attorney: R. Chris Almy
 DA Administrative Assistant: Corinna Rackliff
 Head of Maintenance: Josh York
 Judge of Probate: James R. Austin

County Commissioners and Districts
Piscataquis County is administered by three County Commissioners, each representing one of the three county districts. They are elected for four-year terms. A term of office begins on January 1 following the election in November. County Commissioner meetings are typically held on the 1st and 3rd Tuesdays of the month at the County Courthouse in Dover-Foxcroft. The meetings begin at 8:30 a.m. and continue until the agenda for the meeting has been addressed.

County Commissioners:

District 1:Eric P. Ward

District 2:James D. Annis

District 3:Frederick Trask

County Districts:

District 1 includes the towns of Abbot, Beaver Cove, Greenville, Guilford, Kingsbury Plt, Monson, Parkman, Shirley, Wellington and the Unorganized Territories of Blanchard, Elliotsville and Northwest Piscataquis.

District 2 includes the towns of Dover-Foxcroft,   Sangerville and
Willimantic.

District 3 includes the towns of Bowerbank, Brownville, Lake View Plt, Medford, Milo, Sebec and the Unorganized Territories of Atkinson, Barnard, Ebeeme, Katahdin Iron Works,  Orneville, Williamsburg and Northeast Piscataquis
County.

Voter registration

Elections

County Commissioner
In the 2012 Piscataquis County Commissioner District 2 election, Republican candidate James Annis received 52% of the vote. Democratic candidate Susan Mackey-Andrews received 48%. In the District 3 election, Republican incumbent Frederick Trask received 50.2% (1,282 votes) and Democratic candidate Donald Crossman received 49.8% (1,271 votes) – a difference of 11 votes, confirmed after a recount.

Governor
In the Maine gubernatorial election, 2010, Republican candidate Paul LePage received the most votes in Piscataquis County with 48.4%. Three Independent candidates ran in this election: Eliot Cutler received the second most Piscatquis votes with 36.5% of the total, Shawn Moody received 3.1% and Kevin Scott, 1%. Democratic candidate, Libby Mitchell received the third most votes in the county with 10.9% of the total. Paul LePage was elected governor.

In the Maine gubernatorial election, 2006, Republican candidate Chandler Woodcock received the most votes in Piscataquis County with 37.7%. Democratic candidate, incumbent governor John Baldacci received 34.5%. Independent candidate Barbara Merrill received 19.7%, Green party candidate Pat LaMarche received 7.4%, and Phillip Morris NaPier received .63% of the Piscataquis vote. John Baldacci was reelected governor.

In the Maine gubernatorial election, 2002, Democratic candidate John Baldacci received the most votes in Piscataquis County with 50.4%. Republican candidate Peter Cianchette received 42.9% of the county vote and Green Party candidate, Jonathan Carter received 5.1%. John Baldacci was elected governor.

In the Maine gubernatorial election, 1998, Independent candidate Angus King received the most votes in Piscataquis County with 50.2%. Republican candidate James Longley, Jr. received 26.6%, Democratic candidate Tom Connolly received 10.7%. Other candidates split 12.5% of the vote. Angus King was elected governor.

US House
Piscataquis County is entirely within Maine's 2nd congressional district, which comprises 80% of the state and is the largest district by land area east of the Mississippi River.

In the United States House of Representatives elections in Maine, 2012, incumbent Democratic candidate Michael Michaud received the most Piscataquis County votes with 53% of the total. Republican candidate, Kevin Raye received 47%. Michael Michaud was reelected to the House.

US Senate
In the United States Senate election in Maine, 2012, Independent candidate and former Maine governor, Angus King received the most votes in Piscataquis County with 45.7% of the vote. Republican candidate, Charlie Summers received 40.1% and Democratic candidate Cynthia Dill received 10.4%. Stephen M. Woods received 136 votes, Andrew I. Dodge received 126 votes and Danny F. Dalton, 76 votes.  Angus King was elected to the Senate.

President
In the 2012 United States presidential election, Republican candidate Mitt Romney received the most votes in Piscataquis County with 50.6%. Democratic incumbent Barack Obama received 46.3%. Libertarian candidate Gary Johnson received 1.5% and Green Independent candidate Jill Stein received 1.24%. There were a total of 30 "write in" votes; 29 of these were for Ron Paul and 1 for Rocky Anderson. Barack Obama was reelected President.

Since 2000, Piscataquis County has generally been the most reliably Republican county in Maine, and New England. In 2008, Piscataquis was the only county in New England to vote for John McCain, by a margin of 355 votes or 3.8% over Barack Obama, with Obama winning Maine by a 17.3% margin over McCain. In 2012, Piscataquis was only one of 5 counties in New England to support Republican candidate Mitt Romney. Republican candidate Donald Trump carried the county in 2016 while greatly improving on Romney's performance. He won it again in 2020 with 62% of the vote, marking the first time a Republican presidential candidate won Piscataquis County with over 60% of the vote since Ronald Reagan in 1984.

In 2004, the county was one of only two in Maine to vote for Bush over John Kerry. Bush won by a 9% margin over Kerry, with Kerry winning the state by a virtually even margin over Bush.

In the 2000 U.S. presidential election, George W. Bush carried the county by an 11.9% margin over Al Gore, with Gore carrying the state by a 5.1% margin over Bush.

In 1996, Bill Clinton carried the county with 48.7% of the vote, the first Democrat to do so since 1968.

In the 1992 presidential election, independent Ross Perot won a plurality 36.8% in the county, one of three counties he won in the state.

Communities

Towns

 Abbot
 Beaver Cove
 Bowerbank
 Brownville
 Dover-Foxcroft (county seat)
 Greenville
 Guilford
 Medford
 Milo
 Monson
 Parkman
 Sangerville
 Sebec
 Shirley
 Wellington
 Willimantic

Plantations
 Kingsbury Plantation
 Lake View Plantation

Census-designated places
 Dover-Foxcroft
 Greenville
 Guilford
 Milo

Survey Townships
 T1-R9 WELS

Unorganized territories
 Atkinson
 Blanchard
 Southeast Piscataquis
 Northeast Piscataquis
 Northwest Piscataquis

Notable residents
 Berenice Abbott, photographer
 David Mallett, singer-songwriter
 Sir Hiram Stevens Maxim, inventor
 Sir Harry Oakes, philanthropist
 Roxanne Quimby, businesswoman
 Max Schubel, composer
 Oswald Tippo, botanist

See also
 National Register of Historic Places listings in Piscataquis County, Maine

Notes

References

External links
 Official website of Piscataquis County
 History of Piscataquis County, Maine: From Its Earliest Settlement to 1880. By Amasa Loring. Published 1880.
 Piscataquis County Economic Development Council
 Piscataquis Chamber of Commerce
 Moosehead Lake Region Chamber of Commerce
 Three Rivers Community Alliance
 University of Maine Cooperative Extension Piscataquis County Office

 
Maine counties
Maine placenames of Native American origin
1838 establishments in Maine
Populated places established in 1838